Chicoasén is a town and one of the 119 municipalities of Chiapas, located in southern Mexico. It covers an area of 82 km².

As of 2010, the municipality had a total population of 5,018, up from 3,346 as of 2005. 

As of 2010, the town of Chicoasén had a population of 3,343. Other than the town of Chicoasén, the municipality had 23 localities, none of which had a population over 1,000.

References

Municipalities of Chiapas